is a Japanese manga series by Kei Toume. It was serialized in Shueisha's seinen manga magazine Business Jump from 1997 to 2011, and it moved to Grand Jump, where it ran from 2011 to 2015. Its chapters were collected in eleven tankōbon volumes. An anime television series adaptation produced by Doga Kobo aired from April to June 2020.

Plot

Rikuo Uozumi has all but resigned himself to a bleak future, aimlessly working at a convenience store in Tokyo after graduating from college. His monotonous life is interrupted when the peculiar Haru Nonaka makes a lively appearance, frequently dropping by his workplace to befriend him. When Rikuo learns that an old college friend and crush, Shinako Morinome, has moved back into town, he reaches out to further their relationship. Unbeknownst to Rikuo however, Shinako is carrying painful memories from her past that were holding her back from accepting his feelings. Meanwhile, as Haru continually opens up to Rikuo, he discovers that she, much like him, is living by herself and wants to step out of her comfort zone into an uncertain future.

The past lingers long in the mind, and the future remains elusive. At a crossroads along their intertwined paths, these three experience what it means to let go of their feelings of yesterday and embrace the change that tomorrow brings.

Characters

Main Characters

Rikuo is a college graduate unsure about his future. He currently works at a convenience store. His hobby is photography. He has feelings for Shinako.

Haru is an eccentric girl working at MILK HALL. She adopted a crow and named it Kansuke. Because of the drastic change in her appearance, Rikuo does not remember meeting her five years ago. She often drops by the convenience store before going to work. 

Shinako is Rikuo's classmate from college. She is currently working as a high school teacher. She is still in love with Rō's already deceased older brother. 

Rō is Shinako's childhood friend from Kanazawa.

Rikuo's Circle

Rikuo's co-worker at a convenience store.

Rikuo and Shinako's college classmate.

Takanori's wife.

A pianist and Rikuo's ex-girlfriend. She used to be the keyboard player in Rikuo's former band and is considered to be cursed as every band she played for ended up disbanding.

Haru's Circle

A professional photographer and Haru's ex-classmate who has been in love with her.

Haru's employer. Owner of café "MILK HALL".

Kyōko's high school classmate who's been in love with her.

Izawa's co-worker, has been in pursuit of Haru ever since meeting her.

Amamiya's childhood friend.

Haru's birth mother.

Haru's step-father.

Haru's pet crow.

Shinako's Circle

Shinako's childhood friend and Rō's brother. Died before the start of the series.

Shinako's co-worker.

Shinako's student and Kinoshita's sister.

Takako's classmate and president of the film club.

Rō's Circle

Rō's classmate at prep school.

A model working at Rō's prep school. At some point Rō's girlfriend.

Rō's classmate at prep school. Katsumi's target of affection.

Rō's classmate at prep school. Funatsuka's girlfriend.

Rō's classmate at prep school. Natsuki's boyfriend.

Media

Manga
Written and illustrated by Kei Toume, Sing "Yesterday" for Me started in Shueisha's seinen manga magazine Business Jump in 1997. The name was inspired by a song of the Japanese rock group RC Succession. Business Jump ceased its publication and the last issue was released on October 5, 2011. The series was transferred to the newly launched Grand Jump, where it ran from November 16, 2011, to June 3, 2015. Its chapters were collected in eleven tankōbon volumes, released from March 19, 1999, to September 18, 2015. Extra short chapters were published during the manga run and were collected with other Toume short stories in the  collection on November 20, 2009. An extra chapter, recounting the fate of Haru and Rikuo after the events of the manga, was released in Grand Jump on April 1, 2020,
 and a compilation of short stories, including this chapter and those published in Sing "Yesterday" for Me EX, was released on April 17, 2020, under the title .

Anime
An anime television series adaptation was announced in the 10th issue of Grand Jump magazine on April 17, 2019. Produced by DMM.futureworks and Doga Kobo, the series is directed by Yoshiyuki Fujiwara, with Fujiwara and Jin Tanaka writing the scripts, Junichirō Taniguchi designing the characters, Mami Aida and Kyōko Nagata designing the props, and Kenji Tamai, agehasprings, and Takaaki Kondō composing the music. It aired from April 4 to June 20, 2020 on TV Asahi's new anime programming block NUMAnimation, Abema, and BS Asahi. The series ran for 12 episodes, airing on television and streaming simultaneously on Abema, which the latter also includes extra segments for half the episodes for a total of six.

Notes

References

External links
  
 BS Asahi website 
 
 

Anime series based on manga
Coming-of-age anime and manga
Crunchyroll anime
Doga Kobo
Medialink
NUManimation
Seinen manga
Shueisha manga
TV Asahi original programming